Alessandro Ciarrocchi (born 3 January 1988) is a Swiss former footballer.

Biography
Born in Winterthur, Canton of Zürich, Ciarrocchi started his career at FC Winterthur. In 2006, he was signed by Italian Serie B club Piacenza. On 1 September 2008 Ciarrocchi returned to Switzerland for Bellinzona in temporary deal. The Swiss Italian club signed him outright in April 2009. He followed the club relegated to 2011–12 Swiss Challenge League and again to 2013–14 1. Liga Promotion, which he played once.

On 26 August 2013 Ciarrocchi was signed by Chiasso to a 1+1 year contract. On 17 June 2016 he was signed by FC Aarau to a 2-year contract.

References

External links
Swiss Football League Profile 

1988 births
Swiss-Italian people
People from Winterthur
Sportspeople from the canton of Zürich
Living people
Swiss men's footballers
Association football forwards
Switzerland youth international footballers
Switzerland under-21 international footballers
FC Winterthur players
Piacenza Calcio 1919 players
U.S. Pistoiese 1921 players
AC Bellinzona players
FC Chiasso players
FC Köniz players
FC Aarau players
Yverdon-Sport FC players
FC Bavois players
FC Rapperswil-Jona players
Swiss Challenge League players
Serie B players
Serie C players
Swiss Super League players
2. Liga Interregional players
Swiss Promotion League players
Swiss expatriate footballers
Expatriate footballers in Italy
Swiss expatriate sportspeople in Italy